No. 85 Expeditionary Logistics Wing RAF is a wing of the Royal Air Force A4 Force based at RAF Wittering, England.  

It is made up of several ground transport and logistics handling squadrons, whose role is to establish air and sea ports of disembarkation and the associated supply chain all the way to the front line squadrons.

Structure

No 85 (EL) Wg, with an establishment of approximately 660 personnel, comprises eight air combat service support units: 
 No. 1 Expeditionary Logistics Squadron
 No. 2 Mechanical Transport Squadron
 No. 3 Mobile Catering Squadron
 RAF Mountain Rescue Service

The wing played a major role in the RAF deployment in the run-up to and during Operation Telic.

Commanders

Wing Commander D M Lester-Powell (2002–04)
Wing Commander D H John (2004–06)
Wing Commander A R Curtis (2006–09)
Wing Commander E J Cole (2009–10)
Wing Commander I D Reynolds (2010–12)
Wing Commander A N Grant (2012–14)
Wing Commander G Williams (2014–16)
Wing Commander P Cane (2016–18)
Wing Commander D H P Wright (2018–20)
Wing Commander Wayne Tracey (2020–)

References

Citations

Bibliography

External links
 

Expeditionary Logistics 085
85
Military units and formations of the United Kingdom in the War in Afghanistan (2001–2021)